Henfield is a hamlet in South Gloucestershire, England between Coalpit Heath and Westerleigh, adjoining the hamlet of Ram Hill immediately to the north.

Background

Henfield is a small hamlet that has seen considerable land use change over the recent centuries moving from a traditional agricultural landscape to an active coal mining area by the beginning of the nineteenth century. The noise and pollution associated with mining and railway operations would have been constant. Population would have increased at that time supported by the introduction of new miner's cottages by the Coalpit Heath Colliery Company. The closure of New Engine Pit, the remaining mine, before the end of the nineteenth century represented change but with railway sidings and engine shed at New Engine and the movement of labour to the nearby Parkfield and Frog Lane Pits, the industrial nature of the area was maintained to well into the twentieth century.

The closure of the Frog Lane Pit at Coalpit Heath in 1949 represented a step change in the area and Henfield reverted to its agricultural roots, a quiet clustered hamlet surrounded by pastoral agricultural land. There were new additions at that time with the introduction of Henfield Village Hall and a little ribbon development along the convergent minor roads.  The area was peaceful in the 1950s and early 1960s with little in the way of noise and light pollution. The construction of the M4 Motorway to the south of the hamlet in the late 1960s began to change the character of the area and with the expansion of Bristol and Yate, Henfield has lost its tranquillity and adopted a new role as a commuter satellite to the main urban areas. At the same time the character of the landscape has changed with dairy farming being replaced by new uses in particular "horsiculture" and the manicured landscape of the Kendleshire Golf Course.

However, with a rich heritage and reminders of its links with the past, such as Bitterwell Lake, the hamlet retains an important sense of community.

Industrial Archaeology

Coal Mines
Henfield is situated near the centre of the North Bristol Coal Field, this area at one time having been a prolific coal mining community. Coal had been mined in this area since the fourteenth century and most likely even earlier. However it was Sir Samuel Astry, Lord of the Manor of Westerleigh c1680 who started mining on a grander scale and his descendants, or their business partners, continued to be connected with the Coalpit Heath Colliery Company.

Within Henfield itself there were 4 mines operational in the early nineteenth century:

 Serridge Engine Pit – was sunk in 1785 and located near to Serridge House. This mine was linked by an early tramway to the old Ram Hill pit.
 Orchard (or Middle Wimsey) Pit – was opened in the late eighteenth century and was active at the time the Dramway was completed in 1832 but was superseded by the New Engine Pit soon afterwards.
 No. 11 Pit – little is known of this pit other than its location south of the above pits.
 New Engine Pit was sunk around 1824 and was the only one of the Henfield pits that was still operational after 1867. It had a depth of 502 ft 10ins which at that time was recorded as the deepest shaft sunk in the trough of Coalpit Heath. In the mid-nineteenth century New Engine Pit was the main pit for the Coalpit Heath group of mines.  Most coal for this area was drawn from this pit, the other shafts being kept open for pumping and ventilation. On the New Engine Pit site today there are the remains of a horse gin and an engine house, while the area itself is called New Engine. In 1930 it was recorded that there was an 1832 Acraman steam engine at the New Engine colliery site that was being used to drive a saw mill. However, there is no trace of this engine today.

For the nearby Ram Hill Engine Pit, Ram Hill Colliery, Churchleaze No. 1 Pit and Churchleaze No. 2 Pit see Ram Hill.

The underground map of around 1850 shows that the underground roads of the nearby Ram Hill Colliery and Churchleaze pits on Ram Hill joined with those of the Serridge Engine and New Engine pits.

Bristol and Gloucestershire Railway
In the Bristol and Gloucestershire Railway Act of 19 June 1828, parliament authorised the construction of a horse-drawn railway from Ram Hill to the River Avon in Bristol. It was completed and in use by July 1832. At the same time the Avon and Gloucestershire Railway constructed a connecting line from near Mangotsfield to the River Avon at Keynsham.

The Ram Hill Colliery was the northern terminus and near of Bitterwell Lake (then known as Bitterwell Pond, a colliery drainage sump, there was also a southern spur to New Engine Pit; technical facilities were provided there and it served as a supply depot to other local pits. When New Engine Pit ceased extraction itself, the support facilities continued in use, and it came to be named New Engine Yard.

These early railways provided cheap and easy transport from the mines of Coalpit Heath to the wharves on the Avon at Keynsham and Bristol.  They were built as single track railway, built to the gauge of 4 ft 8 in gauge, with passing places along the route. The whole length of the railway was built on a down hill gradient dropping 225 ft along the route.

The railways were colloquially referred to as the dramway and in recent times this has been formalised by usage on signs indicating the footpath facilities, and on Ordnance Survey mapping.

In 1839 a main line railway, the Bristol and Gloucester Railway obtained its Act of Parliament; this authorised it to take over the Bristol and Gloucestershire line, and to make a main line railway to Gloucester. The railway was to be on the broad gauge (7 ft 0 in, 2,140 mm) and this required the colliery lines to be converted too. It opened on 5 June 1844. The Coalpit Heath group of pits had by then declined, and the line to them beyond New Engine Yard was not converted.

In around 1860 a northern branch was constructed near Boxhedge Farm that served the new Frog Lane Colliery at Coalpit Heath. Following the closure of the New Engine Pit towards the end of the nineteenth century, railway infrastructure at Henfield remained in the form of railway sidings and engine shed. These served the Frog Lane Colliery until its closure in 1949. Some dilapidated built remnants of the railway remain including the old engine shed at New Engine Yard and weighbridge house near Boxhedge Farm.

Community Facilities

Bitterwell Lake

Bitterwell Lake, also referred to as Bitterwell Pond, is situated near the junction of roads leading to Coalpit Heath and Ram Hill. This man-made lake is used as a fishing lake and is owned by Westerleigh Parish Council, and used for bathing, fishing, model yachting and boat hire. It was acquired by the Parish Council in 1930, once owned by the Coalpit Heath Colliery Company.The company used it to soak the pit props for the mine. The lake is over 3 acres in extent and at the time of purchase was surrounded by numerous stone and tiled buildings and two detached cottages with gardens.

It is difficult to establish when precisely the lake was excavated but it was after 1845 as it does not appear on the Westerleigh Tithe Map 1845 and before 1881 as it is clearly shown on the 1st edition (1881) Ordnance Survey Map. There is also uncertainty about the functions of Bitterwell Lake in relation to the mines at Henfield. It may have supplied reservoir water for the mine engines. Sluices regulated water in the lake and within living memory the overflow went to The Clamp, another reservoir pond that had been constructed near the Serridge Pit.

In the 1930s Bitterwell Lake received wide coverage in the newspapers that it was the home of Tarzan who lived in a tree-house and climbed like a monkey.

An example is provided by The Mercury, in Hobart, Tasmania, that reported on 10 October 1934 that in the woods around Bitterwell Lake, near Bristol, is a man aged 20, who lives in the tree tops wearing only a leopard skin.  His name is Bernard Skuse but he is known to his friends as Tarzan.

"That's my favourite tree" he told the "Daily Express" Bristol correspondent pointing out the tallest of a number of trees clustering round the lake. He was at the top in ten seconds swinging through the branches of adjacent trees to reach it.

He lives in an eyrie among the leaves which he built himself. It has a wooden floor and a thatched roof.  His explanation of his predilection for this mode of life is: "I like it so I do it."

He is bronzed with a perfectly proportioned muscular body.  He explained that his feet are rather flat, which makes climbing easy.  When not at work he hunts with a spear, a knife and a bow and arrow.  When he feels hot he dives into the lake."

Nowadays Bitterwell Lake is solely used for fishing but at the same time represents an important local amenity for the surrounding area.  A record 8.5 lb eel was caught at Bitterewell Lake in 1922.  This held the national record for almost half a century.

Village Hall

Henfield Village Hall – Parish Council records indicate that deeds were received in 1948 for land next to Bitterwell Lake to be used for a new village hall for the residents of the Henfield and New Engine. By the 1960s the village hall represented an important facility in the small community with Saturday dances, whist drives, youth club meetings, jumble sales as well as being a setting for the annual village shows.

The Hall has been modernised and is now known as the Henfield Social Club and is available for hire for a range of activities and private functions.

Recreation ground and play facilities

Newman Field – This small recreation area is located next to the Village Hall and Bitterwell Lake.  The land was donated by Jo Newman to the community in 1974.

Village Shop

The community no longer has a village shop but in the past in the 1960s a small store was run by Mrs Tovey.

Governance

The two tiers of local government that are responsible for administering Henfield are:

 South Gloucestershire Council
  Westerleigh Parish Council

Westerleigh Parish Council has 9 elected members.  Matters that have been under recent consideration at Henfield include:

 condition of the Boat Shed at Bitterwell Lake
 play area at Newman Field

Planning
In the adopted  South Gloucestershire Local Plan Henfield does not have a Defined Settlement Boundary on the Proposals Map and there are no sites allocated for new residential development.

The hamlet is within an area defined as Green Belt and is located within the Forest of Avon area.  There are also Major Recreational Routes in the hamlet.

Environment

Landscape

Within the  South Gloucestershire Landscape Character Assessment SPD the hamlet of Henfield is within an area defined as:

Westerleigh Vale and Oldland Ridge – The Study indicates that Ram Hill and Henfield, a colliery settlement, are small dispersed/linear and clustered hamlets respectively, consisting of a mix of, Pennant sandstone with more recent render and brick buildings, focused around a convergence of minor roads and lanes. Around the two settlements are scattered farms.

The area of Ram Hill and Henfield comprises a largely strong, irregular rural framework with areas of woodland, mixed overgrown/clipped hedgerows supplemented with wire fences, defining regular shaped fields.  The clustered settlement pattern and non-agricultural activities such as storage compounds, are reasonably well integrated as a result of this framework.  Horse paddocks are however locally evident where hedgerows have become replaced with fences.  Associated ad hoc home-made stables are also evident and atypical of a rural landscape. Large modern agricultural sheds are prominent within older farm complexes within this area.

The small scale settlement at Ram Hill and Henfield is largely well integrated within the framework of hedgerow trees and woodland. The area has a generally tranquil character, although the presence of stables and fences associated with the increase in land use change to "horsiculture". modern large farm buildings and storage compounds, can detract from this, visually eroding the rural character and resulting in removal or fragmentation of hedgerows. In places the recreational pressure for "horsiculture" with the associated infrastructure of stables, access tracks, exercise areas, jumps and floodlighting. can result in a marked change in landscape character.

Frome Valley – The Study indicates that the Kendleshire Golf Course retains most of the hedgerows and tree structure amongst fairways and greens.  However the Golf Course introduces a different landscape structure compared with the adjacent agricultural landscape.  A more open landscape structure of mown fairways, low mounding, remnant hedgerows and hedgerow trees and young planting is evident. The new planting measures will in time provide a new landscape structure and help integrate this land-use change with its surroundings.

Biodiversity

Two areas of Broadleaved Woodland in Henfield are identified by South Gloucestershire Council as Sites of Nature Conservation Importance:

 Martin Croft Brake
 Branch Pool Wood

There are no Sites of Special Scientific Interest within the hamlet.

Sport and Recreation

Henfield Youth AFC

Henfield Youth AFC was a football club based in the hamlet that was formed in 1960 by a group of local youngsters and their friends.  At the outset the club played friendly matches before joining the Bristol Church of England League in 1961. Under the guidance of Percy Bennett (Chairman), Herbert Livall (Secretary) and Alan Parker (Treasurer) the club progressed from Division 4 to Division 1 of the Church of England League before spending their last few seasons in Division 2.

After initially changing in Henfield Village Hall the club acquired the former Bitterwell Lake Model Yacht Club premises and converted them to changing rooms. The club unfortunately folded in 1972 after losing the use of their ground which was situated on agricultural land adjoining the Village Hall and old Railway Line.  The land is now used as horse paddocks and the only reminder of the former football club is an old training floodlight which overlooks the Village Hall car park and the Newman Field amenity area next to Bitterwell Lake that Percy Bennett created so that youngsters could still have an area to play football.  For a number of years this area, which was donated to Westerleigh Parish Council by Jo Newman, was used for organised small-sided football matches.

Henfield Youth AFC at one time ran two sides and a considerable number of players passed through the club's ranks over the 12-year period.  They included:

 Gordon Bennett – who was Chief Executive of Bristol Rovers, Norwich City F.C. and Aberdeen F.C. and more recently has been Head of Youth Development at Stoke City and currently holds a similar position at Plymouth Argyle.
 Howard Radford – the former Bristol Rovers goalkeeper played occasional matches for Henfield as an outfield player and scored a hat-trick in an evening Berkeley Hospital Cup match.

For a short period the club formed a sister club called Bitterwell Rangers AFC that played in the Bristol & District Sunday League.

The Kendleshire Golf Club

This parkland course is located five minutes from the M32, to the north east of Bristol.

The Hollows & Ruffet Courses were opened in the summer of 1997 to much acclaim. Designed by Adrian Stiff, the courses were set into the rolling Frome valley with plenty of water and an exciting combination of holes from the forgiving to the challenging. In the summer of 2002 the two courses were joined by the Badminton Course, designed by Peter McEvoy to follow the same lines but with his very own twist.

In addition there is the Academy Course which is a six-hole, par three practice course. There are also two putting greens, either side of the clubhouse. Built at the same time, and to the same standards, as the greens on the championship course, the putting greens show the same level of maturity, matching the conditions of the main greens.

There is also a practice range, two bars, a restaurant and a function room.

Education
The hamlet is served by  The Manor C of E Primary School, Coalpit Heath, a primary school currently catering for pupils aged 5–11.

Older children attend The Ridings Federation Winterbourne International Academy.

Transport
Henfield is served by one bus service:

 686: Chipping Sodbury – Yate –  Henfield – Mangotsfield – Kingswood (supported by South Gloucestershire Council)

Location grid

References

Villages in South Gloucestershire District